Royaumont Abbey is a former Cistercian abbey, located near Asnières-sur-Oise in Val-d'Oise, approximately 30 km north of Paris, France.

History

It was built between 1228 and 1235 with the support of Louis IX. Several members of the French Royal family were buried here (and not in Saint Denis Basilica), for example, three children and two grandchildren of Louis IX. The thirteenth century encyclopedist Vincent of Beauvais was a brother at the Abbey as well.

The abbey was dissolved in 1791 during the French Revolution and the stones were partly used to build a factory. However, the sacristy, cloister, and refectory remained intact.

In 1836 and 1838, respectively, two operas by German composer Friedrich von Flotow opened at Royaumont—Sérafine and Le Comte de Saint-Mégrin.

In the early 20th century, the abbey was bought by the Goüin family who in 1964 created the Royaumont Foundation, the first private French cultural foundation. Today, the abbey is a tourist attraction and also serves as a cultural centre.

World War I

From January 1915 to March 1919, the Abbey was turned into a voluntary hospital, Hôpital Auxiliaire 301, operated by Scottish Women's Hospitals(SWH), under the direction of the French Red Cross. It was especially noted for its performance treating soldiers involved in the Battle of the Somme. After the war the Chief Medical Officer, Miss Frances Ivens CBE MS(Lond) ChM(Liverp) FRGOG (1870–1944), was awarded membership of the Légion d'honneur.

Royaumont Abbey in popular culture
The novel In Falling Snow by Australian writer Mary-Rose MacColl (first published in Oct. 2012) is set at Royaumont during the time when it was a military hospital and refers to historical figures like Ms Ivens.

The abbey was used as a filming location for the Catholic boarding school in Jean Delannoy's Les amitiés particulières.

On 15 June 1971, Pink Floyd performed live here in front of an audience at the invitation of the Daudy family, the abbey's current owners. The family are well known in France for their cultivation of artistic talent, their generous philanthropy and their visionary taste in music and dance.

Gallery

References

External links

Official site of the Royaumont Foundation
Photos of the abbey
Romanes.com: abbey pictures
Photos of the abbey (wanadoo.fr)
More photos (flickr.com)
Abbaye de Royaumont
In Falling Snow

Religious buildings and structures completed in 1235
Gardens in Val-d'Oise
Cistercian monasteries in France
Buildings and structures in Val-d'Oise
Christian monasteries established in the 13th century
Tourist attractions in Île-de-France
Tourist attractions in Val-d'Oise
Louis IX of France